Yasmin (Bayer)
Yervoy (Bristol-Myers Squibb)
Yocon (Teva Pharmaceuticals)
Yutopar
yohimbic acid (INN)
yttrium (Y 90) clivatuzumab tetraxetan (USAN)
yttrium (Y 90) ibritumomab tiuxetan (INN)